Puntland TV and Radio is the public broadcasting network of the autonomous Puntland region of Somalia. Its headquarters are at the regional capital of Garowe. The service also maintains an office in London. Founded in April 2013, Puntland TV and Radio broadcasts locally in Somali via terrestrial service. It also airs programs globally through satellite. Radio Puntland broadcasts internationally via shortwave, with its transmission reaching as far as Finland. Its standard programming includes general news, focusing on regional developments, sports and entertainment.

See also
Horn Cable Television
Somali National Television
Universal Television Somalia
Eastern Television Network ETN TV

References

External links
Official Website

Organisations based in Puntland
Television channels in Somalia
Television channels and stations established in 2013